IntercomPlus is the Walgreen Company's proprietary pharmacy computer system. It was founded as Intercom in 1981, and was the first large scale retail pharmacy computer system . It relies on VSAT satellite access and/or broadband connections to link the over 8,000 Walgreens retail, mail service, and specialty pharmacies. Through its usage, Intercom made Walgreens the largest private user of satellite transmission data in the world, second only to the U.S. Government .  The design of the system enables seamless store-to-store prescription filling, making filling a refill at a location other than where it was filled originally essentially no different from filling it again at the original location.

IC+ is written in Team Developer, from Unify (formerly Centura), and comprises the following applications:
TeamRX
Pharmacy Management
Laser Printer/Thermal Printer Settings
Strategic Inventory Management System (SIMS)
StoreNet/RXNet
Scale Sign On
Consultation (CAP)
RX Savings Advisor
Corporate E-Mail Server
RX Compliance Advisor

Intercom Plus is consistently being improved for maximum accuracy and performance.

TeamRX 

This application is the core of IC+.  Paper prescriptions are scanned so that the image can be retained electronically (a program called Walgreens VISION). The scanned image can then be sent to other Walgreens locations through DWB (Dynamic Workload Balancing) or POWER (Pharmacy Optimization Within Enterprise Re-Engineering) for various purposes (data entry or data review). The paper prescription is kept on file per local or state laws. In certain states, the computerized image serves as the legal copy of the prescription and the original paper hard copy becomes the Third Party Audit Record (3PAR).

After the patient, drug, and prescriber information has been entered (often by a technician or pharmacy intern), the prescription is double checked (by a registered pharmacist) to ensure the information was entered accurately. Intercom Plus's Automatic Label Printing System (ALPS) program generates a leaflet for the prescription. The technician then scans the leaflet on a Check-weigh Scale and the system generates a vial label for the prescription after the system performs a National Drug Code (NDC) validation via scanner. The vial label is placed appropriately sized container for the prescription. The system automatically checks the patient's current medication list for any potential drug interactions via Drug Utilization Reviews (DUR).  

Intercom Plus is also used to refill prescriptions and lookup patient records from any Walgreens nationwide.

The work queue is used to view entered, printed, filled, and ready prescriptions.  It is a searchable database containing all active prescriptions for the store.

Pharmacy Management 

Pharmacy Management is used to change drug locations, lookup pharmacy staff information, generate reports, and complete miscellaneous tasks. It also features "dial a pharmacist" which allows a pharmacy team member to call a pharmacist currently signed on to IC+ at another location in order to provide care to patients who speak another language.

Strategic Inventory Management System

This application serves as the store's inventory mainframe. Using this program, pharmacy staff members can verify counts of various items and serves as the proprietary software for receiving and distribution within the company.

StoreNet/RXNet/WalNet 

This is the web interface used by the Walgreen Corporate Staff to interact with Store and District Personnel. StoreNet is used to access various healthcare databases, applications such as People Plus Learning Online Training Program, Basic Department Merchandising Planograms set for all stores, Picture Care Plus Photo Order Management System, Key Performance Indicators for both store and district, Market and Labor Scheduling, and various other applications, information, and forms.

Scale Sign On 

Members of the pharmacy team (pharmacists, pharmacy technicians and interns) must sign onto the filling scales (Check-weigh Scales) in order to use them.

CAP/Consultation Application

This is a program designed to assist Pharmacists in consulting patients. The system maintains a database of patient "charts" and streamlines tasks such as Consultation, Patient DURs, and various other Pharmacist-Specific Tasks. The CAP Application is an important part of the POWER program.

RX Savings Advisor

This is a program that assists pharmacy staff members in enrolling patients in the Prescription Savings Club (PSC) and consulting Medicare beneficiaries in selecting a Medicare Prescription Drug (Part D) Plan.  It allows for management of discount prescription card memberships.

RX Compliance Advisor

An extension of the CAP Application, this program allows pharmacy staff members to recommend various options that increase medication compliance.

See also
Walgreens

Pharmacies